The article list the confirmed men's squads for Olympic Hockey Tournament at the 2000 Summer Olympics in Sydney, Australia.

Pool A

Canada
Head Coach: Shiaz Virjee

Hari Kant (GK)
Mike Mahood (GK)
Ian Bird
Alan Brahmst
Robin D'Abreo
Chris Gifford
Andrew Griffiths
Ken Pereira
Scott Mosher
Peter Milkovich (c)
Bindi Kullar
Rob Short
Ronnie Jagday
Sean Campbell
Paul Wettlaufer
Ravi Kahlon

Germany
Head Coach: Paul Lissek

Christopher Reitz (GK)
Clemens Arnold (GK)
Philipp Crone
Christian Wein
Björn Michel
Sascha Reinelt
Oliver Domke
Christoph Eimer
Björn Emmerling
Christoph Bechmann
Michael Green
Tibor Weißenborn
Florian Kunz
Christian Mayerhöfer (c)
Matthias Witthaus
Ulrich Moissl

Great Britain
Head Coach: Barry Dancer

Simon Mason (GK)
David Luckes (GK)
Jon Wyatt (c)
Julian Halls
Tom Bertram
Craig Parnham
Guy Fordham
Ben Sharpe
Mark Pearn
Jimmy Wallis
Brett Garrard
Bill Waugh
Daniel Hall
Michael Johnson
Calum Giles
David Hacker

Malaysia
Head Coach: Stephen van Huizen

Jamaluddin Roslan (GK)
Maninderjit Singh Magmar
Chua Boon Huat
Krishnamurthy Gobinathan
Kuhan Shanmuganathan
Nor Azlan Bakar
Chairil Anwar
Mohan Jiwa
Ibrahim Suhaimi
Mohamed Madzli Ikmar
Nor Saiful Zaini
Keevan Raj
Mirnawan Nawawi (c)
Calvin Fernandez
Saiful Azli bin Abdul Rahman
Mohamed Nasihin Nubil Ibrahim (GK)

Netherlands
Head Coach: Maurits Hendriks

Ronald Jansen (GK)
Bram Lomans
Diederik van Weel
Erik Jazet
Peter Windt
Wouter van Pelt
Sander van der Weide
Jacques Brinkman
Piet-Hein Geeris
Stephan Veen (c)
Marten Eikelboom
Jeroen Delmee
Guus Vogels (GK)
Teun de Nooijer
Remco van Wijk
Jaap-Derk Buma

Pakistan
Head Coach: Ahmad Iftikhar

Ahmed Alam (GK) (c)
Ali Raza
Tariq Imran
Irfan Yousaf
Imran Yousuf
Waseem Ahmad
Mohammad Nadeem
Atif Bashir
Kamran Ashraf
Muhammad Sarwar
Mohammad Qasim (GK)
Sohail Abbas
Muhammad Shafqat Malik
Sameer Hussain
Kashif Jawwad
Muhammad Anis Ahmed

Pool B

Argentina
Head Coach: Jorge Ruiz

Pablo Moreira (GK) (c)
Juan Pablo Hourquebie
Máximo Pellegrino
Matias Vila
Ezequiel Paulón
Mariano Chao
Mario Almada
Carlos Retegui
Rodrigo Vila
Tomás MacCormik
Santiago Capurro
Marcos Riccardi
Jorge Lombi
Fernando Zylberberg
Germán Orozco
Fernando Oscaris

Australia
Head Coach: Terry Walsh

Michael Brennan
Adam Commens
Jason Duff
Troy Elder
James Elmer
Damon Diletti (GK)
Lachlan Dreher (GK)
Paul Gaudoin
Jay Stacy
Daniel Sproule
Stephen Davies
Michael York (c)
Craig Victory
Stephen Holt
Matthew Wells
Brent Livermore

India
Head Coach: Vasudevan Baskaran

Devesh Chauhan (GK)
Dilip Tirkey
Lazarus Barla
Baljit Singh Saini
Thirumal Valavan
Ramandeep Singh (c)
Mukesh Kumar
londa Riaz
Dhanraj Pillay
Baljit Singh Dhillon
Sameer Dad
Jude Menezes (GK)
Deepak Thakur
Gagan Ajit Singh
Sukhbir Singh Gill
Dinesh Nayak

Korea
Head Coach: Jeon Jae-Hong

Kim Yoon (GK)
Ji Seung-Hwan
Seo Jong-Ho
Kim Chel-Hwan
Kim Yong-Bae
Han Hyung-Bae
Kim Kyung-Seok
Kim Jung-Chul
Song Seung-Tae
Kang Keon-Wook (c)
Hwang Jong-Hyun
Lim Jung-Woo
Jeon Jong-Ha
Jeon Hong-Kwon
Yeo Woon-Kon
Lim Jong-Chun (GK)

Poland
Head Coach: Jerzy Wybieralski

Paweł Sobczak (GK)
Paweł Jakubiak
Dariusz Małecki
Tomasz Szmidt
Robert Grzeszczak (c)
Zbigniew Juszczak
Rafał Grotowski
Krzysztof Wybieralski
Tomasz Choczaj
Piotr Mikuła
Tomasz Cichy
Dariusz Marcinkowski
Łukasz Wybieralski
Aleksander Korcz
Eugeniusz Gaczkowski
Marcin Pobuta (GK)

Spain
Head Coach: Antonio Forrellat

Ramón Jufresa (GK)
Bernardino Herrera (GK)
Joaquim Malgosa (c)
Jaume Amat
Francisco "Kiko" Fábregas
Juan Escarré
Jordi Casas
Pablo Amat
Eduard Tubau
Javier Arnau
Ramón Sala
Juan Dinarés
Josep Sánchez
Pablo Usoz
Xavier Ribas
Rodrigo Garza

References

Men's team squads
2000